St. Dunstan's Church may refer to:

Canada
 St. Dunstan's Basilica, Charlottetown, Prince Edward Island

United Kingdom
 St Dunstan's, Stepney, London Borough of Tower Hamlets
 St Dunstan-in-the-East, City of London
 St Dunstan-in-the-West, City of London
 Church of St. Dunstan, Mayfield, East Sussex
 St. Dunstan's, Canterbury, Kent
 St Dunstan's Church, Woking, Surrey
 Church of St Dunstan, Liverpool, Merseyside
 St Dunstan's Church, Cranford, London Borough of Hounslow
 Church of St Dunstan, Baltonsborough, Somerset
 Church of St Dunstan, Monks Risborough, Buckinghamshire
 St Dunstan's Church, Mayfield, East Sussex
 St Dunstan's Church, Feltham, London Borough of Hounslow

United States
 St. Dunstan's Church of the Highlands Parish, Shoreline, Washington
 St. Dunstan's Episcopal Church (San Diego, California)